Kosmos 347 ( meaning Cosmos 347), known before launch as DS-P1-Yu No.35, was a Soviet satellite which was launched in 1970 as part of the Dnepropetrovsk Sputnik programme. It was a  spacecraft, which was built by the Yuzhnoye Design Bureau, and was used as a radar calibration target for anti-ballistic missile tests.

Launch 
Kosmos 347 was launched from Site 86/4 at Kapustin Yar, atop a Kosmos-2I 63SM carrier rocket. The launch occurred on 12 June 1970 at 09:30:02 UTC, and resulted in the successful deployment of Kosmos 347 into low Earth orbit. Upon reaching orbit, it was assigned its Kosmos designation, and received the International Designator 1970-043A.

Orbit 
Kosmos 347 was the thirty-third of seventy nine DS-P1-Yu satellites to be launched, and the thirtieth of seventy two to successfully reach orbit. It remained in orbit until it decayed and reentered the atmosphere on 7 November 1971.

References

Kosmos satellites
Spacecraft launched in 1970
1970 in the Soviet Union
Dnepropetrovsk Sputnik program